Leifheit AG is a German manufacturing company that makes household products.

History
It was founded in 1959 by Günter Leifheit (13 December 1920 – 2 July 2009) with his wife Ingeborg, as Günter Leifheit KG. He sold the company in 1973. In 2006 he received the Order of Merit of Rhineland-Palatinate.

The company was listed on the Deutsche Börse in 1984. It forms part of the SDAX.

Structure
It is headquartered in Nassau, Rhineland-Palatinate.

Products

It makes kitchen equipment under the name Soehnle.

References

External links

 
 Leifheit UK

German brands
1959 establishments in West Germany
Companies based in Rhineland-Palatinate
Companies listed on the Frankfurt Stock Exchange
Home appliance manufacturers of Germany
Kitchenware brands
Manufacturing companies established in 1959
Rhein-Lahn-Kreis
Weighing scale manufacturers